Glyphipterix oxycopis is a species of sedge moth in the genus Glyphipterix. It was described by Edward Meyrick in 1918. It is found in Assam in India and in Sri Lanka.

References

Moths described in 1918
Glyphipterigidae
Moths of Asia